Trafford is a metropolitan borough in Greater Manchester, England.

Trafford may also refer to:

People
 Trafford Leigh-Mallory (1892–1944), British Air Chief Marshal
 Trafford Smith (1912–1975), British colonial civil servant and Ambassador to Burma
 Trafford (surname)
 De Trafford baronets, including a list of de Traffords
 James Trafford (born 2002), English goalkeeper

Places
 Trafford, Alabama, United States, a town
 Trafford, Pennsylvania, United States, a borough near Pittsburgh

Other uses
 Trafford F.C., a football club based in Trafford
 Trafford College, Trafford, England
 Trafford Centre, a shopping mall in Trafford, England
 Trafford Hall, a former country house in Cheshire, England, now a hotel
 Trafford Mill, a water mill in Cheshire
 Trafford Publishing, a Canadian vanity press using print-on-demand technology

See also
 Old Trafford (disambiguation)
 Bridge Trafford, a hamlet in Cheshire, England
 Mickle Trafford, a village in Cheshire
 Wimbolds Trafford, a village in Cheshire